Andy Armstrong may refer to:

 Andrew "Andy" M. Armstrong, father of musician Billie Joe Armstrong
 Andy Armstrong (cricketer), English cricketer
 Andy Armstrong (filmmaker) (born 1953), writer/director of Moonshine Highway

See also
Andrew Armstrong (disambiguation)